

Incumbents
 President: Heinz Fischer (until 9 July)
 Chancellor: Werner Faymann (until 9 May); Christian Kern (from 17 May)

Governors
 Burgenland: Hans Niessl 
 Carinthia: Peter Kaiser
 Lower Austria: Erwin Pröll 
 Salzburg: Wilfried Haslauer Jr.
 Styria: Hermann Schützenhöfer
 Tyrol: Günther Platter
 Upper Austria: Josef Pühringer 
 Vienna: Michael Häupl 
 Vorarlberg: Markus Wallner

Events

August
August 5 - Austria sent 68 athletes to compete at the 2016 Summer Olympics in Rio de Janeiro, Brazil.

References

 
2010s in Austria
Years of the 21st century in Austria
Austria
Austria